Arlete Guilhermina "Guillermina" Vincente Bombe (born 1983) is a Mozambican actress from Maputo, Mozambique.

Career
In 2017, she was featured in Iacopo Patierno's documentary titled, Wiwanana, alongside Safina Ansumane Ali, Agostino Maico Chipula and others.

She was also featured in Mickey Fonseca's 2019 award-winning film, Redemption ("Resgate" in Portuguese). The film also starred Gil Alexandre, Laquino Fonseca, Tomas Bie, Rachide Abul, Candido Quembo and others.

She was nominated in the AMAA 2019 Award For Best Actress in a Supporting Role category at the 15th Africa Movie Academy Awards (AMAA), for her role in the film, Redemption.

Filmography

Accolades

References

External links
 Arlete Guillermina Bombe on IMDb
 Arlete Bombe on Flixable
 Arlete Guillermina Bombe on Mubi

Mozambican actors
1983 births
Living people